Ethan James may refer to:

 Ethan James (producer) (1946–2003), musician, record producer, and recording engineer
 Ethan James (rugby union), South African rugby union player
 Ethan James (Power Rangers), a fictional Power Rangers character 

James, Ethan